The Wegberg-Wildenrath Test and Validation Centre is a railway test centre owned by Siemens near Wildenrath in North Rhine-Westphalia, Germany.

History
The centre is located on the site of the former RAF Wildenrath British military airfield. After the airfield closed in 1992, it was taken over by Siemens who opened the test and validation centre in June 1997. By 2007, the railway test tracks had taken over considerable areas of the airfield, with all but the western threshold and overrun of the runway obliterated. The north-east dispersal is completely taken over by sidings, workshops and loops. Of the southern dispersals, the central and eastern are bisected by the main railway oval test track.

There are ovals of track for testing trains, and various electrification systems. The test track is connected to the rest of the German railway network by the German portion of the Iron Rhine freight railway, branching off near Wegberg.

Testing

As well as Siemens the test tracks are also used by competitors such as Alstom, Bombardier Transportation and Stadler.

The facility is used for technical acceptance tests and approvals of locomotives, rolling stock and trams under operating conditions, and personnel training. It has been equipped for trials with Galileo.

See also

Transportation Technology Center

References

External links

 Test- and Validationcenter Wegberg-Wildenrath, Siemens Mobility
 Railway tests and test infrastructure right in the heart of Europe, Siemens Mobility

Wildenrath
1997 establishments in Germany